Jennifer Bélanger (born 1991 in Montreal) is a Canadian writer from Quebec. Her debut novel Menthol, published in 2020, was a shortlisted finalist for the Governor General's Award for French-language fiction at the 2020 Governor General's Awards.

References

1991 births
21st-century Canadian novelists
21st-century Canadian women writers
Canadian women novelists
Canadian novelists in French
French Quebecers
Writers from Montreal
Living people